The Constitution of Mongolia adopted in 1992 states that the President of Mongolia is the "head of state and embodiment of the unity of the Mongolian people".

Mongolia declared its independence from the Qing dynasty during the Mongolian Revolution of 1911, under the Bogd Khan (the 8th Jebtsundamba Khutuktu). From 1911 to 1924, the head of state of Mongolia was nominally the Bogd Khan. During 1924 to 1992, during the Mongolian People's Republic, the official title of the head of state underwent several changes, including Chairman of the State Great Khural, Chairman of the Presidium of the State Little Khural, Chairman of the Presidium of the State Great Khural, and finally, Chairman of the Presidium of the People's Great Khural.

Heads of state of Mongolia (1911–present)

(Dates in italics indicate de facto continuation of office)

Timeline

See also
 List of Mongol rulers
 President of Mongolia
 Prime Minister of Mongolia
 List of prime ministers of Mongolia

Notes

References

Heads of state of Mongolia

Mongolia
President
Heads of state
1911 establishments in Mongolia